National Medical College may refer to:

 Calcutta National Medical College, India
 Dhaka National Medical College, Bangladesh
 George Washington University Medical School, formerly the National Medical College of Columbian University, Washington, DC, US
 National Medical College, Birgunj, Nepal